Ploërmel (Gallo language: Pieurmè) is a commune in the Morbihan department in Brittany in north-western France. On 1 January 2019, the former commune Monterrein was merged into Ploërmel.

Character of the town
The town is both modern and medieval, and has easy access to most parts of Brittany. Ploërmel is set on the edge of the Brocéliande forest, which legend proclaims is the home of Merlin the Magician, amongst other fantastical characters.

History
In 1351, during the Breton War of Succession (part of the Hundred Years' War), the town was occupied by the Montfortist faction, supported by the English. The rival French-supported Blois faction controlled nearby Josselin. Two groups of approximately 30 English and French knights staged a tournament at a spot between the two towns, to show their prowess and make money by capturing opponents. The Franco-Breton team eventually won after killing or capturing the Anglo-Breton force. This was later known as the Combat of the Thirty.

In 1944, 10 Resistance fighters were killed by German soldiers. 31 inhabitants were killed, 125 wounded, by the American air raid on the railway station on 12 June, during the Normandy landings.

On 10 December 2006, the city unveiled a statue of Pope John Paul II. It was a gift by Russo-Georgian sculptor Zurab Tsereteli, and has sparked controversy over the separation of Church and State.

The town gave its name to a monastic order, the Brothers of Ploërmel. The Doctor Who actor Tom Baker was a monk of the order for a while in Jersey.

In 2008 from 24 May till 1 June 2008 the City of Ploërmel became the first City in France to host the International Federation of Carnival Cities Congress. The Ploërmel Carnival is the largest in central Brittany and is held on Saturdays at the beginning and end of May.

Population
Inhabitants of Ploërmel are called Ploërmelais. The population data given in the table below refer to the commune in its geography as of January 2020.

Breton language
In 2008, just 2.62% of the town's children received either Breton-medium or bilingual education.

Twin towns
  Cobh, Republic of Ireland
  Apensen, Germany
  Gornau, Germany
  Gorseinon & Llwchwr, Wales
  Kolbuszowa, Poland
  Dabola, Guinea

Cultural references 

An 1859 French opéra comique with music by Giacomo Meyerbeer,  Le pardon de Ploërmel (The Pardon of Ploërmel), was about an annual procession in Ploermel.

Ploërmel was one of the favourite places of the South African-born British female composer, Priaulx Rainier.  She evoked the place in her work for winds and percussion, Ploërmel (1973).

See also
Ploërmel Astronomical Clock

References

External links

Official website 

 Mayors of Morbihan Association 

Communes of Morbihan
Communes nouvelles of Morbihan